Overdetermination occurs when a single-observed effect is determined by multiple causes, any one of which alone would be sufficient to account for ("determine") the effect. That is, there are more causes present than are necessary to cause the effect. In the philosophy of science, this means that more evidence is available than is necessary to justify a conclusion. Overdetermination is in contrast to underdetermination, when the number or strength of causes is insufficient. 

The term "overdetermination" was also used by Sigmund Freud as a key concept in his psychoanalysis.

Freud and psychoanalysis

Freud wrote in The Interpretation of Dreams that many features of dreams were usually "overdetermined," in that they were caused by multiple factors in the life of the dreamer, from the "residue of the day" (superficial memories of recent life) to deeply repressed traumas and unconscious wishes, these being "potent thoughts".  Freud favored interpretations which accounted for such features not only once, but many times, in the context of various levels and complexes of the dreamer's psyche.

The concept was later borrowed for a variety of other realms of thought.

In analytic philosophy

In contemporary analytic philosophy an event or state of affairs is said to be overdetermined if it has two or more distinct, sufficient causes.   In philosophy of mind, the famous case of overdetermination is called mental-physical causal overdetermination. If we accept that a mental state (M) is realized by a physical state (P). And M can cause another mental state (M*) or another physical state (P*). Then, nomologically speaking, P can cause M* or P* too. In this way, M* or P* is both determined by M and P. In other words, both M* and P* are overdetermined. Since either M or P is sufficient for M* or P*, the problem of mental-physical causal overdetermination is the causal redundancy. 

Whereas there may unproblematically be recognised many different necessary conditions of the event's occurrence, no two distinct events may lay claim to be sufficient conditions, since this would lead to overdetermination. A much used example is that of firing squads, the members of which simultaneously firing at and 'killing' their targets. Apparently, no one member can be said to have caused the victims' deaths, since he or she would have been killed anyway. Another example is that Billy and Suzy each throw a rock through a window, and either rock alone could have shattered the window. In this case, similar to the example of firing squads, Billy and Suzy together shatter the window and the result is not overdetermined. Or, we can say, even if these two examples are a kind of overdetermination, this kind of overdetermination is benign.

There are many problems of overdetermination. First, overdetermination is problematic in particular from the viewpoint of a standard counterfactual understanding of causation, according to which an event is the cause of another event if and only if the latter would not have occurred, had the former not occurred. In order to employ this formula to actual complex situations, implicit or explicit conditions need to be accepted to be circumstantial, since the list of counterfactually acceptable causes would otherwise be impractically long (e.g. the Earth's continued existence could be said to be the (necessary) cause of one drinking one's coffee). Unless a circumstance-clause is included, the putative cause to which one wishes to draw attention could never be considered sufficient, and hence not comply with the counterfactual analysis. Second, overdetermination is problematic in that we do not know how to explain where the extra causation "comes from" and "goes". This makes overdetermination mysterious.

Richards and literature

The New Critic I. A. Richards used the idea of overdetermination to explain the importance of ambiguity in rhetoric, the philosophy of language, and literary criticism.

Althusser and structuralist Marxism

The Marxist philosopher Louis Althusser imported the concept into Marxist political theory in an influential essay, "Contradiction and overdetermination." Drawing from both Freud and Mao Zedong, Althusser used the idea of overdetermination as a way of thinking about the multiple, often opposed, forces active at once in any political situation, without falling into an overly simple idea of these forces being simply "contradictory."  Brewster, in Althusser et al.'s Reading Capital defines overdetermination as such:

"Althusser uses [overdetermination] to describe the effects of the contradictions in each practice constituting the social formation on the social formation as a whole, and hence back on each practice and each contradiction, defining the pattern of dominance and subordination, antagonism and non-antagonism of the contradictions in the structure in dominance at any given historical moment. More precisely, the overdetermination of a contradiction is the reflection in it of its conditions of existence within the complex whole, that is, of the other contradictions in the complex whole, in other words its uneven development."

An instance of a popular riot calling for revolution could exemplify overdetermination.  The event has to it, in capitalist culture, an over-application (determination) of agitation. The determinant contradictions (the reasons for popular revolt) are not addressed and so their great mass is "displaced" onto the singular event.

See also
 Occam's razor
 Open systems
 Parametric determinism
 Multivariate statistics

References
 Louis Althusser. "Contradiction and Overdetermination." In For Marx Verso 1985 
 Louis Althusser et al. Reading Capital Verso 1993 
 Sigmund Freud. The Interpretation of Dreams HarperCollins 1976  (Hardcover)  (Paperback)
 I. A. Richards. The Philosophy of Rhetoric Oxford University Press 1965  (Library Binding)  (Paperback)

Specific

External links
 "Contradiction and Overdetermination"

Marxism
Philosophy of science
Psychoanalytic terminology
Freudian psychology